Iván Gil Calero (born 18 January 2000) is a Spanish footballer who plays as a midfielder for FC Andorra.

Club career
Born in Sant Boi de Llobregat, Barcelona, Catalonia, Gil joined RCD Espanyol's youth setup in 2014, after representing CD Marianao Poblet, CF Gavà and UD Sector Montserratina. He made his senior debut with the reserves on 25 August 2019, coming on as a late substitute for Nico Melamed in a 2–0 Segunda División B home win over FC Andorra.

Gil scored his first senior goals on 10 November 2019, netting a brace in a 3–1 home success over SD Ejea. On 20 December, he renewed his contract until 2022.

On 20 July 2021, Gil terminated his contract with the Pericos, and moved to Primera División RFEF side FC Andorra three days later. He was regularly used during his first season, scoring six goals in 29 appearances overall as the club achieved a first-ever promotion to Segunda División.

Gil made his professional debut on 15 August 2022, replacing Sergio Molina in a 1–0 away win over Real Oviedo.

References

External links

2000 births
Living people
People from Baix Llobregat
Sportspeople from the Province of Barcelona
Spanish footballers
Footballers from Catalonia
Association football midfielders
Segunda División players
Primera Federación players
Segunda División B players
RCD Espanyol B footballers
FC Andorra players
Spanish expatriate footballers
Expatriate footballers in Andorra
Spanish expatriate sportspeople in Andorra